The 2007 Grand Finale was the final round of the 2007 V8 Supercar season. It was held on the weekend of the 30 November to 2 December 2007 at Phillip Island in Victoria.

Results

Qualifying

Timesheets:

Race 1 results
Timesheets:

References

External links
 V8 Supercar website
 Official timing 

Dunlop Grand Finale
Motorsport at Phillip Island